Roberto Innocent Faria (born 15 January 2004) is a Brazilian racing driver who is currently racing in the 2023 FIA Formula 3 Championship with PHM Racing by Charouz. He previously raced in the GB3 Championship with Fortec Motorsports. He was a member of the Sauber Academy.

Career

Karting 
Having began karting at the age of 11, Faria soon moved into European competitions, racing in the Karting World Championship in 2017. He would compete for KR Motorsport in 2018, racing in the European and World championships.

Lower formulae 
Faria made his single-seater racing debut in 2019, competing for Fortec Motorsports in the F4 British Championship alongside Mariano Martínez. He would experience a difficult season, scoring a best finish of fourth at Silverstone and finishing eleventh in the standings, one place and fifty points ahead of his teammate.

FIA Formula 3 Championship 
In September 2022, Faria partook in the FIA Formula 3 post-season test with Van Amersfoort Racing during the first day. In February 2023, Faria was announced as a PHM Racing by Charouz driver for the 2023 FIA Formula 3 Championship.

Formula One 
In 2022 Faria became a member of the Sauber Academy.

Karting record

Karting career summary 

† As Faria was a guest driver, he was ineligible to score points.

Racing record

Racing career summary 

* Season still in progress.

Complete F4 British Championship results
(key) (Races in bold indicate pole position) (Races in italics indicate fastest lap)

Complete BRDC British F3 Championship results
(key) (Races in bold indicate pole position) (Races in italics indicate fastest lap)

Complete F3 Asian Championship results
(key) (Races in bold indicate pole position) (Races in italics indicate fastest lap)

† Driver did not finish the race, but was classified as they completed over 75% of the race distance.

Complete FIA Formula 3 Championship results 
(key) (Races in bold indicate pole position) (Races in italics indicate fastest lap)

* Season still in progress.

References

External links 
 

Living people
2004 births
Brazilian racing drivers
BRDC British Formula 3 Championship drivers
Sportspeople from Rio de Janeiro (city)
British F4 Championship drivers
F3 Asian Championship drivers
Carlin racing drivers
Karting World Championship drivers
Fortec Motorsport drivers
Sauber Motorsport drivers
FIA Formula 3 Championship drivers
PHM Racing drivers
Charouz Racing System drivers